Igor Soroka (born 27 May 1991) is a Russian handball player for HBC CSKA Moscow and the Russian national team.

He competed at the 2016 European Men's Handball Championship.

References

External links

1991 births
Living people
Russian male handball players
Expatriate handball players
Russian expatriate sportspeople in Ukraine
People from Cherkessk
HC Motor Zaporizhia players
Sportspeople from Karachay-Cherkessia